Chiyoko Szlavnics (born 1967 in Toronto, Ontario) is a Canadian experimental composer currently based in Berlin, Germany.

Education and Career
Szlavnics graduated  with honours in 1989 from the University of Toronto Faculty of Music, where she studied with James Tenney, and moved to Berlin ten years later. Her work often employs forms derived from visual art.

References

External links
 Chiyoko Szlavnics from Discogs website
 official website

Living people
1967 births
Musicians from Toronto
Experimental composers
21st-century Canadian composers
Canadian expatriates in Germany
Canadian women composers
21st-century Canadian women musicians